Vets in Practice is a BBC fly-on-the-wall documentary series that followed a group of trainee veterinary surgeons. The first episode, Animal Magic, aired at 8 pm on 26 August 1997. Series one attracted 8.09 million viewers (39 per cent audience share). It made celebrities of Trude Mostue and Steve Leonard, who became TV presenters.

Filming took place at various locations in England and Wales, including Longleat Safari Park, as well as veterinary practices in Kenya, Botswana, Turkey, and the Bahamas.

In 1999, it won Most Popular Documentary Series at the National Television Awards.

Series overview

Specials

Return to... Vets in Practice
In July 2008, BBC Two broadcast a five-part series called Return to... Vets in Practice, catching up with the stars of Vets in Practice, and highlights from the original series.

References

External links
Vets in Practice at the Internet Movie Database

Vets in Practice at Screenonline
Britain's Docusoaps Transfix a Nation of Flies on the Wall – 15 Nov 1998 at The New York Times
BBC puts down Vets in Practice – 25 Apr 2002 at The Guardian
Lifting the lid: Maria Lowe – 16 Nov 2002 at The Telegraph
Return to... Vets in Practice
Emma Milne talks to Yorkshire Life – 11 Jan 2010 at Yorkshire Life

1997 British television series debuts
2002 British television series endings
BBC television documentaries
1990s British documentary television series
2000s British documentary television series
1990s British reality television series
2000s British reality television series
Television shows set in Botswana
Television shows set in Bristol
Television shows set in Norfolk
Television shows set in Turkey
Television shows set in Wales
Television shows set in Yorkshire
English-language television shows
Veterinary medicine in the United Kingdom
Veterinary reality television series